Lake Hell 'n Blazes, Hellen Blazes or Helen Blazes, is the source of the St. Johns River, located in Brevard County, Florida, United States, about  southwest of Melbourne.

The name "Hell 'n Blazes" has been attributed to the words used by early 20th century fishermenmen while trying to navigate through floating islands, and to the formerly remote location of the lake. The variants "Hellen Blazes" and "Helen Blazes" have been used as euphemisms.

Heavy rainfall sends large quantities of polluted water into the lake. The lake had been reputed to be one of the best bass-fishing lakes in Florida, but was in decline by the 1970s. Bass stopped spawning in the lake, and rarely entered it. In 1992 the lake was clogged with hydrilla and water hyacinth. By 1994 drainage had left the lake with only a foot or two of water, grounding the floating islands it was known for.

A 1992 report to the Florida Fish and Wildlife Conservation Commission concluded that dredging accumulated sediment from the lake bottom would restore the bass fishery in the lake.  no funding had been approved for a dredging project.

The nearby Helen Blazes archaeological site is named for the lake.

References

Sources

Hell'n Blazes
Hell'n Blazes
St. Johns River